DaJohn Harris (born January 24, 1989) is a former American football defensive end. He played college football at Southern California.

College career
Harris attended University of Southern California from 2007 to 2011. Harris was a member of Sigma Chi Fraternity, Alpha Upsilon Chapter.

Professional career

Tennessee Titans
Harris was signed as an undrafted free agent by the Titans. He was released on August 30, 2013.

Washington Redskins
Harris was signed to the practice squad of the Washington Redskins on December 3, 2013.

Los Angeles KISS
On May 28, 2015, Harris was assigned to the Los Angeles KISS of the Arena Football League.

Personal life
Harris is married to soccer player Dominique Randle, a member of the Philippines women's national team.

References

External links
USC Trojans bio

1989 births
Living people
American football defensive tackles
USC Trojans football players
Tennessee Titans players
Washington Redskins players
Los Angeles Kiss players